Articles related to the field of journalism include:

0–9 
 24-hour news cycle
 2003 invasion of Iraq media coverage

A 
 ABC News
 Advocacy journalism
 Afghanistanism
 AP Stylebook
 Assignment editor
 Associated Press

B 
 Beat reporting
 Breaking news

C 
 Canadian Association of Journalists
 CBC News
 CBS News 
 Chart
 Chicago circulation wars
 Citizen journalism
 CNN
 Columnist
 Committee to Protect Journalists
 Copy editing
 Creative nonfiction

D 
 Dak edition
 Decline of newspapers
 Deep Throat
 Desktop publishing

E 
 Editing
 Editor
 Editor-at-Large
 Editorial
 Editorial board
 Editorial independence
 Editorial page
 Embedded journalist
 Eyewitness News

F 
 First Amendment to the United States Constitution
 Fourth Estate
 Fox News Channel 
 Freedom of the press
 Free newspaper
 Full disclosure

G 
 Gag order
 Gotcha journalism
 Graphic design

H 
 Headline
 Headlinese
 Hedcut 
 History of American newspapers
 Hostile media effect
 House style

I 
 Information graphic
 International Association of Independent Journalists Inc.
 Inverted pyramid (journalism)
 Investigative journalism
 Interpretive journalism

J 
 Journalese
 Journalism
 Journalism ethics and standards
 Journalism scandals
 Journalism school
 Journalist

L 
 Letter to the editor
 List of daily news podcasts
 List of newspapers
 Literary journalism
 Local news

M 
 Magazine
 Managing editor
 Mass media
 Masthead        
 Media balance
 Media bias
 Muckraker

N 
 Nameplate
 NBC News
 New Journalism
 New York Times
 News
 News agency
 News design
 News media
 News release  
 News source
 News style
 News values
 Newseum
 Newspaper
 Newspaper circulation
 Newsprint

O 
 Obituary
 Objectivity
 Online newspaper
 Op-ed
 The Open Notebook

P 
 Pie chart
 Photojournalism
 Print syndication 
 Printing
 Proofreading
 Publisher
 Pulitzer Prize

R 
 Remembrance Day of Journalists Killed in the Line of Duty
 Reporter
 Reporters Without Borders
 Reuters
 profession

S 
 Science journalism
 Sob sister (journalism)
 Sportswriting
 Star-Ledger
 Style guide

T 
 Tabloid journalism
 Teletype
 Television news
 Trade journalism
 Typography

U 
 United Press International

v 
 Vox

W 
 Wall Street Journal

Y 
 Yellow journalism

 

.
.
journ